XPB (xeroderma pigmentosum type B) is an ATP-dependent DNA helicase in humans that is a part of the TFIIH transcription factor complex.

Structure
The 3D-structure of the archaeal homolog of XPB has been solved by X-ray crystallography by Dr. John Tainer and his group at The Scripps Research Institute.

Function
XPB plays a significant role in normal basal transcription, transcription coupled repair (TCR), and nucleotide excision repair (NER). Purified XPB has been shown to unwind DNA with 3’-5’ polarity.

The function of the XPB(ERCC3) protein in NER is to assist in unwinding the DNA double helix after damage is initially recognized.  NER is a multi-step pathway that removes a wide range of different DNA damages that distort normal base pairing.  Such damages include bulky chemical adducts, UV-induced pyrimidine dimers, and several forms of oxidative damage.  Mutations in the XPB(ERCC3) gene can lead, in humans, to xeroderma pigmentosum (XP) or XP combined with Cockayne syndrome (XPCS).  Mutant XPB cells from individuals with the XPCS phenotype are sensitive to UV irradiation and acute oxidative stress.

Disorders
Mutations in XPB and other related complementation groups, XPA-XPG, leads to a number of genetic disorders such as Xeroderma pigmentosum, Cockayne's syndrome, and trichothiodystrophy.

Interactions
XPB has been shown to interact with:

 BCR gene, 
 CDK7, 
 ERCC2, 
 GTF2H1, 
 GTF2H2, 
 GTF2H4,
 GTF2H5, 
 P53, 
 PSMC5,  and
 XPC.

Small molecule inhibitors
Potent, bioactive natural products like triptolide that inhibit mammalian transcription via inhibition of the XPB subunit of the general transcription factor TFIIH has been recently reported as a glucose conjugate for targeting hypoxic cancer cells with increased glucose transporter expression.

See also
 XP

References

Further reading

External links
  GeneReviews/NIH/NCBI/UW entry on Xeroderma Pigmentosum
 

EC 3.6.4
DNA replication
Helicases